The New Zealand Forest Accord is an accord among forestry associations and environmental groups that was signed in 1991.

Signatories
 New Zealand Forest Owners' Association
 New Zealand Timber Industry Federation
 New Zealand Farm Forestry Association
 New Zealand Wood Panels Manufacturing Association
 Royal Forest and Bird Protection Society of New Zealand
 Environment and Conservation Organisations of Aotearoa New Zealand
 Federated Mountain Clubs
 Friends of the Earth
 Beech Action Committee
 Pacific Institute of Resource Management
 World Wildlife Fund (New Zealand)
 Japan Tropical Forest Action Network
 Tropical Forest Action Group
 Maruia Society

See also
Forestry in New Zealand

References 

Environment of New Zealand
1991 in the environment